Joseph Turmel (13 December 1859 Rennes (Ille-et-Vilaine) – February 1943) was a French Catholic priest, historian of Christian dogmas, who was excommunicated.

Biography 
Joseph Turmel was born on December 13, 1859 in Rennes, 142, rue de Saint-Malo. After studying at the seminaries of Rennes and Angers.

Studies and priestly activity
From 1876 to 1880, he studied philosophy and theology at the Major Seminary of the Archdiocese of Rennes, thereafter he continued until 1882 his studies at the Faculty of Theology of University of Angers.

Modernism and excommunication
He was excommunicated for Modernism as a vitandus.

He is sometimes referred to as patristician.

Works 
Under his name

 Histoire de l'angéologie, des temps apostoliques à la fin du ve siècle, Revue d'histoire et de littérature religieuses, 3, 1898.
 Histoire du dogme du péché originel, Macon, Protat, 1904.
 Tertullien, Bloud, 1905
 Histoire de la théologie positive, du Concile de Trente au Concile du Vatican, Paris, Beauchesne, 1906.
 vol. I 
 vol. II 
 Histoire du dogme de la papauté, des origines jusqu'à la fin du IVe siècle, Paris, Picard, 1908.
 Histoire du diable, Paris, Rieder, 1931.
 Histoire des dogmes, Rieder, 1931–1937, 6 vol., 3151 p. 
 vol. I : Le péché originel. La rédemption, 1931, 464 p.
 vol. II : La Trinité. L'Incarnation. La Vierge Marie, 1932, 529 p.
 vol. III : La papauté, 1933, 498 p.
 vol. IV : Le créationisme, les anges. La vie d'outre-tombe. Canon et inspiration des Écritures. La grâce sanctifiante, 1935, 485 p.
 vol. V : La grâce actuelle, les sacrements en général, le baptême, la confirmation, l'eucharistie, le mariage, 569 p.
 vol. VI : La pénitence, la confession, l'extrême-onction. L'ordre. Conclusion, 1937, 547 p.
 Comment j'ai donné congé aux dogmes, Éd. de L'Idée libre, Bibliothèque du libre penseur, Herblay, 1935. Reissue under the title En Soutane. Mémoires, Éd. des Malassis, 2016.
 La Bible expliquée, Herblay, Éd. de L'Idée libre, 1936.
 Réfutation du catéchisme, Herblay, Idée libre, 1937.
 Comment l'Église romaine m'a donné congé, Herblay, 1937. Reissue under the title En Soutane. Mémoires, Ed. des Malassis, 2016.
 Les Religions, Herblay, Idée libre, 1938.
 Le suaire de Turin, suivi d'un « Courte histoire du faux suaire de Cadouin », Éd. de l’Idée libre, Bibliothèque du libre penseur, Herblay, 1938.
 Dieu, Herblay, Éd. de L'Idée libre, Bibliothèque du libre penseur, 1940.

Works under pseudonyms:

 Antoine Dupin, Le dogme de la Trinité dans les trois premiers siècles, Paris, 1907.
 Guillaume Herzog, La Sainte Vierge dans l'histoire. Paris, Nourry, 1908.
 Henri Delafosse, Le quatrième Évangile, Rieder, 1925
 Henri Delafosse, Les écrits de saint Paul, Paris, Rieder, 1926–1928, 4 vol.
 vol. I : L'épître aux Romains
 vol. II : La première épître aux Corinthiens
 vol. III : La seconde épître aux Corinthiens
 vol. IV : L'épître aux Philippiens
 Louis Coulange, La messe, Rieder, 1927 
 Armand Dulac (= Joseph Turmel) and Albert Houtin, Courte histoire du célibat ecclésiastique, Rieder, 1929
 Louis Coulange, Catéchisme pour adultes, Rieder, 1929-1930
 vol. I : Les dogmes
 vol. II : Les institutions

References

Bibliography 
Articles:
 

Studies :
Dujardin, Édouard. Grandeur et décadence de la critique. Sa rénovation. Le cas de l'abbé Turmel. Paris, Messein, 1931.
Sartiaux, Félix. Joseph Turmel, prêtre, historien des dogmes. Paris, Rieder, 1931.
Rivière, Jean. Le dogme de la Rédemption devant l'histoire, un plaidoyer de M. Turmel, Paris, J. Gabalda & Cie, 1936.
 Actes du colloque Actualité de l’œuvre anticléricale et antireligieuse de l’abbé Joseph Turmel à l’occasion du soixantenaire de sa disparition. éd LA LIBRE PENSEE 35 /association Joseph Turmel.
 Département des manuscrits de la Bibliothèque nationale, documents concernant Joseph Turmel donnés par Mme Félix Sartiaux (n. a. fr. 17780-17792). (Signalés dans Bibliothèque de l'école des chartes, 1985, vol. 143, consultable en ligne.)

Freethought
Deaths in Paris
1859 births
1943 deaths